Kathy Watson (born 1953 or 1954) is a former Canadian politician, who served as mayor of Whitehorse, Yukon from 1994 to 2000.

First elected to Whitehorse City Council in 1991, she won election to the mayoralty in 1994.

Late in her term, she faced criticism for approving a plan to contribute municipal funding to a controversial shopping mall development in the city.

She did not run for another term in the 2000 municipal election, and was succeeded by Ernie Bourassa. She is currently a government relations manager with the Natural Health Practitioners of Canada Association.

References 

Mayors of Whitehorse
Women mayors of places in Yukon
Living people
1950s births
Place of birth missing (living people)